Dédé is a 1935 French comedy film directed by René Guissart, based on the operetta Dédé by Albert Willemetz, and starring Danielle Darrieux, Albert Préjean and Mireille Perrey. The music is by Henri Christiné.

External links

1935 films
Films directed by René Guissart
French black-and-white films
Films based on operettas
French comedy films
1935 comedy films
1930s French films